Sengkang Depot is a train depot in Sengkang, Singapore operated by SBS Transit. It is the first co-location of facilities for both the Mass Rapid Transit (MRT) and Light Rail Transit (LRT). It maintains the trains for the North East line, Sengkang LRT line, and Punggol LRT line, and houses the control centre of the three lines.

The depot was designed by architects 61 and constructed by Hyundai Engineering & Construction Co. at a contract sum of S$350 million under contract C701. It is the first in Singapore to be built with structural provisions for an industrial development to be situated on top, to minimise the waste of scare land resources.

The MRT depot is located between Hougang station and Sengkang station on the North East line and has three reception tracks: Two northbound tracks towards Sengkang station and one southbound track towards Hougang station.

The LRT depot is located between Layar station and Tongkang station on the Sengkang LRT line. It has two reception tracks: One eastward track towards Tongkang station and one westward track towards Layar station.

Expansion
On 5 February 2021, LTA announced plans for the expansion of Sengkang LRT depot from the existing 3.5-hectare to 11.1-hectare. The expanded depot will provide increased stabling capacity, a new maintenance workshop and two new reception tracks in anticipation for the procurement of 17 two-car trains to boost the Sengkang-Punggol LRT's (SPLRT) capacity. In addition, the existing power supply systems will be enhanced and three new traction power stations will be added to the existing five for improved traction power to support the additional trains. Expansion works are slated to begin in end-2021, and scheduled to be completed by 2027.

Gallery

References

Mass Rapid Transit (Singapore) depots
Light Rail Transit (Singapore) depots
Buildings and structures in Sengkang
Transport in North-East Region, Singapore
2003 establishments in Singapore
Sengkang